Neurofilament light polypeptide, also known as neurofilament light chain, is a neurofilament protein that in humans is encoded by the NEFL gene. Neurofilament light chain is a biomarker that can be measured with immunoassays in cerebrospinal fluid and plasma and reflects axonal damage in a wide variety of neurological disorders. It is a useful marker for disease monitoring in amyotrophic lateral sclerosis, multiple sclerosis, Alzheimer's disease, and more recently Huntington's disease. It is also promising marker for follow-up of patients with brain tumors. Higher numbers have been associated with increased mortality.

It is associated with Charcot–Marie–Tooth disease 1F and 2E.

Interactions 

Neurofilament light polypeptide has been shown to interact with:
 MAP2, 
 Protein kinase N1,  and
 TSC1.

References

Further reading

External links 

 
  In 
  In 

Human proteins
Biomarkers